Invictus (Latin for "unconquered") may refer to:

"Invictus" is a short poem by William Ernest Henley.

Invictus may also refer to:

Music
 "Invictus", Edwardian setting of the poem by composer Bruno Siegfried Huhn
 Invictus (Virgin Steele album), 1998
 Invictus (George Kollias album), 2015
 Invictus (Iconoclast III), a 2010 album by Heaven Shall Burn
 "Invictus", a composition for band by Karl King
 Invictus Records, a record label operating between 1968 and 1977
 Invictus: A Passion, a 2018 choral work by Howard Goodall

Video gaming
 Invictus (Vampire: The Requiem), a covenant in the role-playing game
 Invictus Games (company), a PC games company dedicated to the racing genre
 Invictus Gaming, an eSports team

Other uses
 Invictus (film), a 2009 biographical sport drama film
 Invictus Games, an international sporting event for wounded soldiers
 Invictus (epithet), a Latin epithet for various Roman deities meaning "unconquered, invincible"
 Invictus (novel), a 2016 Eagles of the Empire novel by Simon Scarrow
 "Invictus", a 2018 television special continuation of the animated series 12 oz. Mouse

See also
 Sol Invictus, a sun god of the Roman Empire
 Sol Invictus (band), English neofolk and neoclassical group fronted by Tony Wakeford
 Invicta (disambiguation)